The Netsuite Open 2015 is the men's edition of the 2015 Netsuite Open, which is a tournament of the PSA World Tour event International (prize money: $100,000). The event took place at the Justin Herman Plaza in San Francisco in the United States from 25 to 29 of September. Ramy Ashour won his second Netsuite Open trophy, beating Nick Matthew in the final.

Prize money and ranking points
For 2015, the prize purse was $100,000. The prize money and points breakdown is as follows:

Seeds

Draw and results

See also
2015 PSA World Tour
Netsuite Open

References

External links
PSA Netsuite Open 2014 website
Netsuite Open official website

Netsuite Open
Netsuite Open Squash
2015 in American sports
2015 in squash